

Missionaries
Gabriele Allegra, O.F.M. – missionary to China to translate the Bible
Francisco Álvares – Portuguese missionary to Ethiopia.
Saint Amand – missionary of Flanders
José de Anchieta – Spanish missionary in Brazil
Alexis Bachelot – missionary to Hawaii
Alonzo de Barcena – missionary and linguist
Carlos Filipe Ximenes Belo – missionary in Mozambique
Jean-Rémy Bessieux – missionary to Gabon and its first bishop
Giacomo Bini – Franciscan missionary to Rwanda
Libert H. Boeynaems – missionary to Hawaii
Luis de Bolaños – missionary who started the Indian Reductions system in Paraguay
François Bourgade – one of the first Christian missionaries to Muslim North Africa
Jean de Brébeuf – French Jesuit martyr in Canada who wrote "Huron Carol"
Luis Cancer – missionary in Hispañola, Central America and Florida
Saint Daniele Comboni – Italian bishop and missionary to Africa
Peter of Saint Joseph de Betancur – Spanish missionary in Guatemala
Father Damien – missionary to Hawaii known for working with the lepers
Anton Docher – French missionary in New Mexico, defender of the Native Americans
Louis William Valentine Dubourg – missionary to the US
Francis Xavier Ford – missionary to China, martyr and Servant of God
Joseph Freinademetz – nineteenth-century canonized missionary to China
René Goupil – French missionary to what is now Canada
Évariste Régis Huc – French missionary in nineteenth century China
Isaac Jogues – French missionary to what is now Canada
John of Montecorvino – Franciscan missionary to China in Medieval times
Jordanus – Dominican missionary to India
Peter Richard Kenrick – Irish missionary to the US
Eusebio Kino – pioneer Jesuit missionary and explorer to what is now Baja California, Northwest Mexico, and the southwest US 
Fermín Lasuén – founder of numerous missions in Baja California
Segundo Llorente – Spanish missionary to Alaska
Jacques Marquette – missionary and explorer
Peter Hildebrand Meienberg – missionary to East Africa 
Victor Mosele – missionary to Sierra Leone
Saint Ninian – missionary of Scotland
Marcos de Niza – French Franciscan missionary who accompanied Francisco Vásquez de Coronado
Roberto de Nobili – Jesuit missionary in India who learned Tamil and Sanskrit
Odoric of Pordenone – Franciscan missionary to China in Medieval times
Juan de Padilla – Franciscan who accompanied Coronado
Alexander de Rhodes – French Jesuit important to the history of Christianity in Vietnam
Matteo Ricci – Jesuit missionary in China
Junípero Serra – founded the mission system of what is now the US state of California
Mother Teresa – missionary to India
Alessandro Valignano – Italian Jesuit who supervised missions in the Far East, particularly Japan
Józef Wojaczek
William of Rubruck – Franciscan missionary to the Mongols
Francis Xavier – Jesuit missionary to India and Japan
Padre Antonio Vieira – Portuguese Jesuit missionary to Brazil and South America, converted Indians in South America; called the Great Father of the indegian people in South America, was against the inquisition, and probably is one of the biggest converters of people to Roman Catholic faith

See also
List of Catholic missionaries in China

References

List
Missionaries
Roman Catholic